The Copa de la Reina de Baloncesto 2014 was the 52nd edition of the Spanish Queen's Basketball Cup. It is managed by the Spanish Basketball Federation – FEB and was held in Torrejón de Ardoz, in the Pabellón Jorge Garbajosa on February 22–23, 2014. Rivas Ecópolis was the host team. Perfumerías Avenida won its fourth Copa de la Reina title.

Venue

Qualified teams 
Besides, Rivas Ecópolis who was designated host of the tournament, the other three top teams at the end of first leg of the LFB Regular Season, qualified for the

(H) Qualified as Host

Draw 
The draw was held in Zamora on January 24, 2014.

Bracket

Semi finals

Final

References and notes

External links 
 2014 Copa de la Reina official website
 Copa de la Reina official guidebook

2014
2013–14 in Spanish women's basketball
2013–14 in Spanish basketball cups